Dufferin (Shuswap language: Txwiyéyut) is a neighbourhood of the City of Kamloops, British Columbia, Canada.  Originally its own municipality, created in 1971, it was amalgamated with the City of Kamloops in 1973.

See also
Dufferin (disambiguation)

References

Neighbourhoods in Kamloops